Big Water is a town in Kane County, Utah, United States. The population was 475 at the 2010 census, up from 417 at the 2000 census. It was originally called Glen Canyon City and housed workers who built the dam in the 1950s.

Big Water made news in the 1980s as a polygamous colony of the Joseph clan. It also made news in 1986, when the mayor Alex Joseph and the city council left the Republican Party to join the Libertarian Party. This made Joseph the first Libertarian mayor in the history of the U.S. Subsequently, Willy Marshall, also a Libertarian, was elected as the state's first openly gay mayor in 2001.

It was the first place in the United States with a city council where every member was in the Libertarian Party.

Geography

Climate
According to the Köppen Climate Classification system, Big Water has a semi-arid climate, abbreviated "BSk" on climate maps.

Demographics

As of the census of 2000, there were 417 people, 171 households, and 117 families residing in the town. The population density was 68.7 people per square mile (26.5/km2). There were 264 housing units at an average density of 43.5 per square mile (16.8/km2). The racial makeup of the town was 94.00% White, 2.88% Native American, 0.24% Asian, 0.48% Pacific Islander, 1.20% from other races, and 1.20% from two or more races. Hispanic or Latino of any race were 5.28% of the population.

There were 171 households, out of which 32.2% had children under the age of 18 living with them, 52.6% were married couples living together, 12.3% had a female householder with no husband present, and 31.0% were non-families. 26.3% of all households were made up of individuals, and 5.8% had someone living alone who was 65 years of age or older. The average household size was 2.44, and the average family size was 2.97.

In the town, the population was spread out, with 28.5% under 18, 6.5% from 18 to 24, 25.9% from 25 to 44, 31.2% from 45 to 64, and 7.9% who were 65 years of age or older. The median age was 39 years. For every 100 females, there were 103.4 males. For every 100 females aged 18 and over, there were 106.9 males.

The median income for a household in the town was $30,278, and the median income for a family was $37,917. Males had a median income of $29,091 versus $17,917 for females. The per capita income for the town was $15,026. About 11.0% of families and 14.5% of the population were below the poverty line, including 16.1% of those under age 18 and 22.2% of those aged 65 or over.

See also

 List of cities and towns in Utah

References

External links

 

Towns in Kane County, Utah
Towns in Utah
Populated places established in 1983